James Wheeler Fuller III (1873 – April 4, 1929), known as Colonel Fuller, was an American industrialist known for manufacturing conveyor belts used for cement production.  He was the son of James W. Fuller Jr.

Colonel Fuller became sole owner of the Lehigh Car, Wheel & Axle Works subsequent to the death of his father in 1910.  In 1918, Lehigh Car, Wheel & Axle changed its name to Fuller-Lehigh.  In 1927 it was sold to Babcock & Wilcox which operated it until 1936 when they transferred all operations to Barberton, OH.

Colonel Fuller started the Fuller Company in 1926, which specialized in manufacturing conveyor belts used in the cement production process.  The company also manufactured the Fuller-Kinyon pump, which are still in use today.  They are heavy-duty pneumatic screw pumps that are able to convey dry, free-flowing, or pulverized materials.

Colonel Fuller became V.P. & General Manager of Allentown Portland Cement Company, as well as the President & Director of Empire Steel and Iron Company, the successor to Lehigh Crane Iron Company.

References 

1873 births
1929 deaths
American industrialists